Whaley Bridge is a civil parish in the High Peak district of Derbyshire, England.  The parish contains 27 listed buildings that are recorded in the National Heritage List for England.  Of these, two are listed at Grade II*, the middle of the three grades, and the others are at Grade II, the lowest grade.  The parish contains the town of Whaley Bridge and the surrounding area.  The Peak Forest Canal passes through the parish, and the listed buildings associated with it are an aqueduct, a horse tunnel, and a transhipment warehouse.  Most of the other listed buildings are houses, cottages and associated structures, farmhouses and farm buildings.  The rest of the listed buildings include churches and a chapel, a hotel and a public house, a road bridge, a milestone, a colliery air shaft tower, and a railway bridge.


Key

Buildings

References

Citations

Sources

 

Lists of listed buildings in Derbyshire